The European Technology Platform (ETP) for the Electricity Networks of the Future (SmartGrids) is a European Commission initiative that aims at boosting the competitive situation of the European Union in the field of electricity networks, especially smart power grids. The ETP represents all European stakeholders. The establishment of an ETP in this field was for the first time suggested by the industrial stakeholders and the research community at the first International Conference on the Integration of Renewable Energy Sources and Distributed Energy Resources, which was held in December 2004.

The SmartGrids Platform was started by the European Commission Directorate General for Research of the European Commission in 2005.

See also 

 Net metering
 Unified Smart Grid or USG (United States proposed system)
 V2G

References

Sources
 International Conference on the Integration of Renewable Energy Sources and Distributed Energy Resources
 Strategic Research Agenda

External links
 SmartGrids official website
 CORDIS official ETPs website

Science and technology in Europe
European Union and science and technology